Think Like a Man Too is the first soundtrack album by American R&B singer-songwriter Mary J. Blige and serves as the soundtrack from the film of the same name. The soundtrack album was released on June 17, 2014, by Epic Records. The album features guest appearances from The-Dream and Pharrell Williams, while production was handled by Rodney Jerkins, The-Dream, Tricky Stewart, Pharrell Williams, Pop & Oak, Jerry Duplessis, and Ronald "Flippa" Colson, among others.

Think Like a Man Too debuted at number 30 on the US Billboard 200 chart, with 8,688 copies sold its first week. It also debuted on the Top R&B/Hip-Hop Albums chart at number six, her 16th top ten entry on the chart.

Background
On May 30, 2014, it was announced that Think Like A Man Too (Music From & Inspired By the Film) would introduce an entire collection of new songs by Mary J. Blige, including the single "Suitcase". The music showcases Blige's signature sound, while her remake of Shalamar's hit "A Night To Remember" is inspired by key scenes in both the film and trailer. Influenced by the backdrop to the film, "Vegas Nights" featuring The-Dream was included as the end credits to the film, while "Moment of Love" showcases the songstress' powerful and passionate vocals.

Singles
"Suitcase" was released for download on June 3, 2014 as the first single from the soundtrack. It was later sent for urban contemporary and urban adult contemporary airplay in the US on June 10, 2014. The song was produced and co-written by Mark J. Feist.

Other songs
"Moment of Love" and the Shalamar remake,"A Night to Remember", were released as promotional singles on iTunes on June 3, 2014 as part of the album pre-order.

Critical response 

Think Like a Man Too received generally mixed reviews from music critics. Andy Kellmann of AllMusic gave the album a positive review, calling it "a solid, elegant '70s throwback dashed with Latin, Philly, and Memphis soul touches and an easy groove." He found that "as a soundtrack, it's an enjoyable change of pace". Associated Press writer Melanie J. Sims found that "Blige, the Queen of Hip-Hop Soul, easily proves herself more than capable of exercising a vocal and emotional range to capture all the ups, downs and misfires one might expect from a movie inspired by Steve Harvey's best-selling relationship guide book." She added that "as a whole, the Think Like a Man Too compilation reveals that while women and men might be closer to figuring each other out, we can never outsmart love."

Commenting on the album's moderate sales debut, Mikael Wood from the Los Angeles Times wrote that "in a sense, Blige appears to have anticipated such a cool reception: This might be her laziest album ever [...] None of this stuff is great; I’d be shocked if any of it ends up on Blige’s next hits disc. But it’s kind of a kick to hear this avatar of artistic seriousness – the woman Bono once asked to help remake the grandiose “One” – in such a lightweight mode. If only it hadn’t blown away so easily."

Commercial performance
In the United States, Think Like a Man Too debuted at number 30 on the Billboard 200, with 8,688 copies sold in its first week, becoming the lowest sales debut of any of Blige's albums. On Billboards Top R&B/Hip-Hop Albums chart, the soundtrack album charted at number six, marking Blige's 16th top ten entry on the chart, tying her with Mariah Carey for the second-most top tens by a female artist.

Track listing

Notes
 signifies a co-producer

Sampling credits
"A Night to Remember" is a cover of the Shalamar song of the same name.
"Wonderful" contains a sample from "Push It Along" as performed by A Tribe Called Quest.
"Kiss and Make Up" contains a sample from "Every Generation" as performed by Ronnie Laws.
"Cargo" contains a sample from "Fool Yourself" as performed by Little Feat.

Personnel

Mary J. Blige—Primary Artist, Composer, Vocals, Executive Producer
The-Dream—Featured Artist, Composer, Producer
Pharrell Williams—Featured Artist, Composer, Producer
Christopher Stewart—Composer, Producer
Rodney Jerkins—Producer, Musician
Mark J. Feist—Composer, Producer
Jerry Duplessis—Composer, Producer
Arden Altion—Composer, Producer
Ronald "Flippa" Colson—Composer, Producer
Oak—Composer, Producer
Pop—Composer, Producer
Ace Face—Composer, Producer
Darhyl Camper—Composer, Producer
Bart Schoudel—Vocal Producer, Engineer
Brian Thomas—Engineer
Andrew Coleman—Arranger, Engineer
Mike Larson—Arranger, Engineer
Nick Valentin—Assistant Engineer
Ian Mercel—Assistant Engineer
Jaycen Joshua—Mixing
Dave Kutch—Mastering

Charts

Weekly charts

References

External links
 MaryJBlige.com — official site

Mary J. Blige albums
2014 soundtrack albums
Epic Records soundtracks
Albums produced by Oak Felder
Albums produced by Rodney Jerkins
Albums produced by The-Dream
Albums produced by Tricky Stewart